Oberzent is a town in the district of Odenwaldkreis, in Hesse, Germany. It was created with effect from 1 January 2018 by the merger of the former town Beerfelden and the former municipalities of Hesseneck, Rothenberg and Sensbachtal.

Geography

Neighbouring communities
Oberzent borders in the north on the municipality of Mossautal, the town of Erbach and the municipality of Kirchzell (Miltenberg district in Bavaria), in the east on the municipality of Mudau (Neckar-Odenwald-Kreis in Baden-Württemberg), in the south on the towns of Eberbach (Rhein-Neckar-Kreis in Baden-Württemberg) and Hirschhorn (Neckar) (Kreis Bergstraße) and in the west on the municipality of Wald-Michelbach (Kreis Bergstraße).

Constituent communities
Oberzent’s 19 quarters are Airlenbach, Beerfelden, Etzean, Falken-Gesäß, Finkenbach, Gammelsbach, Hebstahl, Hesselbach, Hetzbach, Hinterbach, Kailbach, Kortelshütte, Ober-Hainbrunn, Ober-Sensbach, Olfen, Raubach, Rothenberg, Schöllenbach, Unter-Sensbach.

References

Odenwaldkreis